Rogelio Martinez (c. 1981 – November 19, 2017) was an agent of the United States Border Patrol who died in the line of duty on November 19, 2017 in Culberson County, Texas. His cause of death remains unsolved despite a four-month investigation by the FBI.

Early life and career
Martinez was born circa 1981. He lived in El Paso, he was engaged, and he had an 11-year-old son. He served in the Border Patrol from August 12, 2013 to November 19, 2017, and he was based out of the CBP station in Van Horn, Texas.

Death
On November 18, he was patrolling the border in Culberson County, Texas with another agent, Stephen Garland, who called for back-up. Later that day, Martinez was found unconscious in a culvert off Interstate 10, 30 miles away from Mexico, and Garland was unable to remember what had happened. Martinez died in an El Paso hospital the following day, on November 19; he was 36. His funeral was attended by Attorney General Jeff Sessions.

According to the U.S. Customs and Border Protection website, Martinez is the most recent Border Patrol agent to have died in the line of duty as of June 2019; the previous one was Isaac Morales in May 2017.

Public reactions
President Donald Trump, Governor Greg Abbott, and Senator Ted Cruz suggested Martinez had been murdered, and Brandon Judd of the National Border Patrol Council added he must have been "attacked from behind." President Trump added Martinez's death buttressed his support for the construction of a border wall between Mexico and the United States. 

By February 2018, the F.B.I. had been unable to determine whether his death was murder or an accident during the course of their four-month investigation, despite conducting 650 interviews. An internal memorandum authored by Acting Commissioner Kevin McAleenan suggested Martinez may have fallen in the culvert, but he added that the death remained unsolved due to an "absence of evidence."

See also
List of unsolved deaths

References

1980s births
2017 deaths
Deaths by person in Texas
People from El Paso, Texas
United States Border Patrol agents
Unsolved deaths in the United States